Lorna M. Hughes  (born 1 May 1968) has been Professor in Digital Humanities at the University of Glasgow since 2015. From 2016 to 2019, she oversaw the redevelopment of the Information Studies subject area (previously HATII, the Humanities Advanced Technology and Information Institute.) The re-launch was marked by an international symposium at the University of Glasgow in 2017.

Hughes studied at the University of Glasgow, where she completed a MPhil in History and Computing. Her Master's research on the structure and contingencies of data in seventeenth century Scottish landholding charters was used in the first edition of the TEI Guidelines in 1990. 

Hughes's research addresses the creation of digital cultural heritage, and the use and re-use of digital collections for research, teaching, and public engagement. She has a specific interest in the conceptualisation, development, implementation and categorisation of digital methods in the humanities, and the collaborations between the humanities and scientific disciplines that drive this agenda. Amongst her publications, she is the author of Digitizing Collections: Strategic Issues for the Information Manager, published by Facet in 2004, and editor of Digital Collections: Use, Value and Impact, published by Facet in 2011. She is the co-editor of The Virtual Representation of the Past (with Mark Greengrass) published by Ashgate in 2008; and Cultural Heritage Infrastructures in Digital Humanities, (with Agiatis Benardou, Erik Champion, and Costis Dallas. Her digital outputs include “Rhyfel Byd 1914-1918 a’r profiad Cymreig / Welsh experience of the First World War 1914-1918”. National Library of Wales, and the digital archive and performance: “The Snows of Yesteryear: Narrating extreme weather”, National Library of Wales/Aberystwyth University. She has made numerous media appearances, including BBC Radio 4's Today discussing sustainability of digital cultural heritage. Hughes was elected to the Academia Europaea (Academy of Europe) in 2020.

Career 

Hughes has worked in digital humanities, and on the development of hybrid digital collections based on material culture held by memory institutions, at several organisations in the US and UK. In 2015, she was Chair in Digital Humanities at the School of Advanced Study, University of London. From 2011-15, she was the University of Wales Chair in Digital Collections, the world’s first Chair in Digital Collections, based in the National Library of Wales, holding three chairs in one year. She has also held digital humanities posts at New York University, Oxford University, King's College London, and Arizona State University.

Collaborative research 

Hughes's research is intensely collaborative, and practice led. In her inaugural lecture at the University of Glasgow, on 24 February 2018, she stated that "I’ve not just seen but lived how digital humanities is, by its very nature, collaborative: I’ve had the pleasure of conducting research with colleagues from the, arts, humanities, and sciences; from cultural heritage and other research organisations, and with developers, funders, data scientists and technical experts…the collaborative building and making of digital cultural heritage bridges the interdiscplinarity and experimentation of the digital humanities, and the creation and management of information in cultural heritage, and enables a theoretical and practice-led critical framework for the production and consumption of knowledge in a digital age".

Hughes has had leading roles - as primary investigator, or co-investigator - over twenty funded research projects, including The Snows of Yesteryear: Narrating Extreme Weather, the digital archive The Welsh Experience of the First World War; the EPSRC-AHRC Scottish National Heritage Partnership; the Living Legacies 1914-18 Engagement Centre, Listening and British cultures: listeners' responses to music in Britain, c. 1700-2018, and the EU DESIR project (DARIAH Digital Sustainability). With Alistair Dunning and Agiatis Benardou, Hughes established Europeana Research, and since 2015 she has been chair of the Europeana Research Advisory Board, and is a member of the Governing Board of EuroScience, and became  vice-president in 2018. She was the Chair of the European Science Foundation (ESF) Network for Digital Methods in the Arts and Humanities, and is a former secretary of the Alliance of Digital Humanities Organisations (ADHO), and former president of the Association for Computers and the Humanities (ACH). Hughes has had visiting positions at the University of Graz, and a visiting scientist at the Digital Curation Unit, Athena Research Institute, Greece.

National Library of Wales 
From 2011 to 2015 Hughes was University of Wales Chair in Digital Collections, a unique post funded by the University of Wales and based in the National Library of Wales. In this post, she established a Research Programme in Digital Collections, which included documentary heritage and material culture in Welsh collections. In parallel with her Chair based in NLW, Hughes held a fellowship at the University of Wales Centre for Advanced Welsh and Celtic Studies.

Cymru1914.org 
One of the major projects Hughes developed at NLW was “Rhyfel Byd 1914-1918 a’r profiad Cymreig / Welsh experience of the First World War 1914-1918”. This digital archive is an integrated collection of materials relating to the impact of the First World War on all aspects of Welsh life, from the archives and special collections of Wales. The project was funded by the Jisc e-content programme as a mass digitisation initiative, and launched by the Welsh Government Minister of Culture, John Griffith, in 2013. Hughes documented the development of the project as an open, co-produced digital resource, via a blog and via a process of participatory design, bringing digital humanities principles to the creation of a digital archive. She also worked with key communities to ensure that the archive would be re-used – and therefore sustained – and that it played a key role in the Welsh First World War Centenary activities, working closely with Wales Remembers, the national programme for the commemoration of the First World War. Cymru1914.org was one of the first projects announced by First Minister Carwyn Jones when he launched Wales Remembers in 2012.

The digital archive has been used extensively. Paul O’Leary at Aberystwyth University has used the content to develop an Omeka-based digital exhibition on the Great War and the Valleys, exploring the impact on civilians of "Total War". It also enabled the artist Bedwyr Williams to create the sound and video installation Traw, commissioned as a public artwork by 14-18-NOW. The work contained images of unknown recruits and conscripts from Llandeilo and Ammanford, digitised from the D.C. Harries Collection of glass plate negatives held by the National Library of Wales. It has been used to visualise the references to Belgian Refugees in Wales from 1914 to 1918. The AHRC has also recently awarded funding to a project that will enable further linking material in cymru1914.org with data from other archives relating to Belgian refugees.

References 

Living people
Academics of the University of Glasgow
People in digital humanities
1968 births